Yarongmulu Railway Station is a closed railway station on Queensland's Main Line. It was given a name in February 1913.

Only the abandoned signal box and privately owned signalman's house remains of the station.

References

Disused railway stations in Queensland
Main Line railway, Queensland